Granje is a village in Požega-Slavonia County, Croatia. The village is administered as a part of the Jakšić municipality.
According to national census of 2011, population of the village is 108.

Sources

Populated places in Požega-Slavonia County